Blurs (also released as Spots) is a 2011 Croatian drama film written and directed by Aldo Tardozzi.

Cast
 Iskra Jirsak as Lana
 Nika Miskovic as Irena
 Živko Anočić as Igor
 Ozren Grabarić as Zdravko
 Goran Grgic as Lanin tata
 Sanja Vejnovic as Lanina mama

References

External links
 

2011 films
2011 crime drama films
2011 directorial debut films
Croatian crime drama films
2010s Croatian-language films
Crime films based on actual events